Herridge is a surname. Notable people with the surname include:

Catherine Herridge (born 1964), American journalist
Dean Herridge (born 1976), Australian rally driver
Herbert Wilfred Herridge (1895–1973), Canadian politician
Robert Herridge (1914–1981), American television producer and writer
Tom Herridge, English rugby league footballer who played in the 1900s, 1910s and 1920s, and professional boxer of the 1900s
Victoria Herridge, British palaeontologist
William Duncan Herridge (1887–1961), Canadian politician and diplomat

See also
Herridge Lake, lake in Ontario, Canada